Construction Companies, sometimes referred to as Aero Construction Companies, were United States Army Air Service units that served during World War I. First authorized in December 1917, these companies were created, originally under the Aviation Section, Signal Corps, to serve as skilled laborers in the construction of various projects in the United Kingdom, the majority of which involved the building of facilities relating to aviation. Half of these units, however, would remain in the U.S., where they worked on various airfields. By the end of the war, over 6,000 men had enlisted across 39 construction companies.

Organization and role 
On December 5, 1917, The United States and the United Kingdom signed an agreement that, among other things, called for the U.S. to supply 6,200 American laborers to use as construction workers for various building projects relating to the Royal Flying Corps. Later that month, in response to the agreement, came the authorization of the first construction companies, all of which were to be organized at Kelly Field in Texas. The next month, on January 26, 1918, the U.S. and U.K. signed another agreement, known as the Rothermere-Foulois agreement or Handley-Page agreement, which called for the arrival of 3,000 American laborers to arrive by June, though these troops were to have a more specific purpose. Originally, however, the labor for the Handley-Page agreement was meant to be supplied by African-American units though difficulty with quickly finding sufficient numbers of trade specialist made this impossible. In response 9 white construction companies were furnished instead, these units originally organized for work under the December 5th agreement. The original 3,000 African-American laborers were still to be organized and were to be placed under the December 5 agreement. Many African-American tradesmen would be organized into various labor battalions serving in France.

Both of these agreements called for these laborers to be made up of bricklayers, carpenters, and general non-specific laborers. Of these general laborers were to make up the majority in both agreements, followed by bricklayers, then carpenters. Of the 39 construction companies, 12 were bricklayers, 4 were carpenters, and 23 were laborers.

From March to April 1918, the first 9 Construction Companies, all bricklaying, arrived in England to provide the labor for the December 5th agreement. Companies 10–19, excluding the 13th, went to work on the construction projects under the Handley-Page agreement. These 19 companies were assigned to the Service of Supply troops which was a part of the American Expeditionary Force. The remaining 20 companies spent the rest of the war in the U.S. under the construction division, though they were meant for overseas service the war ended before they could be shipped off. While in the states these companies mainly worked on the construction of Lee Hall, Langley Field, and various aviation fields on Long Island. Only one non-Overseas company was stationed outside New York and Virginia, that being the 24th which was stationed in Florida, though this occurred after the war.

Trades and examinations 

In order to be assigned to the construction companies, nearly all men had to be proficient in at least 1 of 57 different trades. Following their enlistment, the men would undergo a medical examination then proceed to list their profession to an officer who would then direct them to an oral examiner. These oral examinations would be given to the recruit by a fellow enlisted man with experience in their respective occupation. Some trades had practical examinations as well, which was overseen by a chief of section and various examiners. Once the men completed their required testing they would then be granted to join their company. Those who failed their exams, both oral and practical, would again be questioned and if a substitute trade could not be found they would then, generally, be assigned to other units. In addition to these examinations a company would also undergo the standard military training as they could be sent to the front once their construction duties were finished.

The 57 trades are as follows: (Note that some trades received the same examination as others)

List of companies 
The first 12 Construction Companies were mustered into service in January of 1918 and by August all were overseas in England, with the first units arriving in March. In the spring another 27 companies were authorized for creation.

First wave

Second wave

Construction Projects 
Information regarding specific work done by the companies is not widely known, and only Companies 1, 2, 11, 12, and 16 have their construction history fully documented. As such the following list will assume that, based on the Order of Battle of the United States land forces in the World War volume 3 part 3, these companies participated in the construction of the various fields, bases, etc. in which they were stationed.

Work in England

Work in the United States

References 

American construction companies